David Hackett Souter (born September 17, 1939) is an American lawyer and jurist who served as an associate justice of the U.S. Supreme Court from 1990 until his retirement in 2009. Appointed by President George H. W. Bush to fill the seat that had been vacated by William J. Brennan Jr., Souter sat on both the Rehnquist and the Roberts courts.

Souter grew up in Massachusetts and New Hampshire and attended Harvard College, Magdalen College, Oxford, and Harvard Law School. After briefly working in private practice, he moved to public service. He served as a prosecutor (1966–1968) in the New Hampshire Attorney General's office (1968–1976), as the attorney general of New Hampshire (1976–1978), as an associate justice of the Superior Court of New Hampshire (1978–1983), as an associate justice of the New Hampshire Supreme Court (1983–1990), and briefly as a judge of the United States Court of Appeals for the First Circuit (1990).

Souter was nominated to the Supreme Court without a significant "paper trail" but was expected to be a conservative justice. Within a few years of his appointment, Souter moved towards the ideological center. He eventually came to vote reliably with the Court's liberal wing. In mid-2009, after Democrat Barack Obama took office as U.S. president, Souter announced his retirement from the Court. He was succeeded by Sonia Sotomayor. Souter has continued to hear cases by designation at the circuit court level.

Early life and education 
Souter was born in Melrose, Massachusetts, on September 17, 1939, the only child of Joseph Alexander Souter (1904–1976) and Helen Adams (Hackett) Souter (1907–1995). At age 11, he moved with his family to their farm in Weare, New Hampshire.

Souter graduated second in his class from Concord High School in 1957. He then attended Harvard University, graduating in 1961 with an A.B., magna cum laude, in philosophy and writing a senior thesis on the legal positivism of Supreme Court Justice Oliver Wendell Holmes Jr. While at Harvard, Souter was inducted into Phi Beta Kappa. He was selected as a Rhodes Scholar and earned a Bachelor of Arts degree (later promoted to a Master of Arts degree, as per tradition) from Magdalen College, Oxford, in 1963. He graduated in 1966 with a Bachelor of Laws degree from Harvard Law School.

Early career 

In 1968, after two years as an associate at the law firm of Orr & Reno in Concord, New Hampshire, Souter realized he disliked private practice and began his career in public service by accepting a position as an Assistant Attorney General of New Hampshire. As Assistant Attorney General he prosecuted criminal cases in the courts. In 1971, Warren Rudman, then the Attorney General of New Hampshire, selected Souter to be the Deputy Attorney General. Souter succeeded Rudman as New Hampshire Attorney General in 1976.

In 1978, with the support of his friend Rudman, Souter was named an associate justice of the Superior Court of New Hampshire. As a judge on the Superior Court he heard cases in two counties and was noted for his tough sentencing. With four years of trial court experience, Souter was appointed to the New Hampshire Supreme Court as an associate justice in 1983.

Shortly after George H. W. Bush was sworn in as President, he nominated Souter for a seat on the United States Court of Appeals for the First Circuit. Souter had had seven years of judicial experience at the appellate level, four years at the trial court level, and ten years with the Attorney General's office. He was confirmed by unanimous consent of the Senate on April 27, 1990.

U.S. Supreme Court appointment 
President George H. W. Bush originally considered appointing Clarence Thomas to Brennan's seat, but decided that Thomas did not have enough experience as a judge. Warren Rudman, who had since been elected to the U.S. Senate, and former New Hampshire Governor John H. Sununu, then Bush's chief of staff, suggested Souter, and were instrumental in his nomination and confirmation. Bush was reportedly "highly impressed by Souter's intellectual seriousness" and Souter's intellect, "particularly impressive in one-on-one meetings", was reported to have been a persuasive factor in his nomination. At the time, few observers outside New Hampshire knew who Souter was, although he had reportedly been on Reagan's short list of nominees for the Supreme Court seat that eventually went to Anthony Kennedy.

Souter was seen as a "stealth justice" whose professional record in the state courts provoked little real controversy and provided a minimal "paper trail" on issues of U.S. Constitutional law. Bush saw the lack of a paper trail as an asset, because one of President Reagan's nominees, Robert Bork, had been rejected by the Senate partially because of his extensive written opinions on controversial issues. Bush nominated Souter on July 25, 1990, saying that he did not know Souter's stances on abortion, affirmative action, or other issues.

Senate confirmation hearings were held beginning on September 13, 1990. The National Organization for Women opposed Souter's nomination and held a rally outside the Senate during his confirmation hearings. The president of NOW, Molly Yard, testified that Souter would "end freedom for women in this country." Souter was also opposed by the NAACP, which urged its 500,000 members to write letters to their senators asking them to oppose the nomination. In Souter's opening statement before the Judiciary Committee of the Senate he summed up the lessons he had learned as a judge of the New Hampshire courts:

Despite the organized opposition, Souter won confirmation easily. Souter's performance at the confirmation hearings ensured his approval by the Senate; Walter Dellinger, a liberal Democrat and an adviser to the Senate Judiciary Committee, called Souter "the most intellectually impressive nominee I've ever seen". The Senate Judiciary Committee reported out the nomination by a vote of 13–1, and the Senate confirmed the nomination by a vote of 90–9; Souter was sworn into office shortly thereafter, on October 9, 1990.

The nine senators voting against Souter included Ted Kennedy and John Kerry from Souter's neighboring state of Massachusetts. These senators, along with seven others, painted Souter as a right-winger in the mold of Robert Bork.

U.S. Supreme Court career 

Souter opposed having cameras in the Supreme Court during oral arguments because he said questions would be taken out of context by the media and the proceedings would be politicized.

He also served as the Court's designated representative to Congress on at least one occasion, testifying before committees of that body about the Court's needs for additional funding to refurbish its building and for other projects.

Expected conservatism 
At the time of Souter's appointment, John Sununu assured President Bush and conservatives that Souter would be a "home run" for conservatism. In his testimony before the Senate, he was thought by conservatives to be a strict constructionist on constitutional matters, but he portrayed himself as a moderate who disliked radical change and attached a high importance to precedent. In the state attorney general's office and as a state Supreme Court judge, he had never been tested on matters of federal law.

After the appointment of Clarence Thomas, Souter moved toward the ideological middle. In two 1992 cases, Souter voted with the Court's liberal wing: Planned Parenthood v. Casey, in which the Court reaffirmed the essential holding in Roe v. Wade but narrowed its scope; and Lee v. Weisman, in which Souter voted against allowing prayer at a high school graduation ceremony. In Planned Parenthood v. Casey, Kennedy considered overturning Roe and upholding all the restrictions at issue in Casey. Souter considered upholding all the restrictions but was uneasy about overturning Roe. After consulting with O'Connor, the three (who came to be known as the "troika") developed a joint opinion that upheld all the restrictions in Casey except the mandatory notification of a husband while asserting the essential holding of Roe, that the Constitution protects the right to an abortion.

By the late 1990s, Souter began to align himself more with Stephen Breyer and Ruth Bader Ginsburg, although as of 1995, he sided on more occasions with the more liberal justice John Paul Stevens than either Breyer or Ginsburg, both Clinton appointees. O'Connor began to move to the center. On death penalty cases, workers' rights cases, defendants' rights cases, and other issues, Souter began increasingly voting with the Court's liberals, and later came to be considered part of the Court's liberal wing. Because of this, many conservatives view Souter's appointment an error of the Bush presidency. For example, after widespread speculation that President George W. Bush intended to appoint Alberto Gonzales—whose perceived views on affirmative action and abortion drew criticism—to the Court, some conservative Senate staffers popularized the slogan "Gonzales is Spanish for Souter".

A Wall Street Journal opinion piece ten years after Souter's nomination called Souter a "liberal jurist" and said that Rudman took "pride in recounting how he sold Mr. Souter to gullible White House Chief of Staff John Sununu as a confirmable conservative. Then they both sold the judge to President Bush, who wanted above all else to avoid a confirmation battle." Rudman wrote in his memoir that he had "suspected all along" that Souter would not "overturn activist liberal precedents." Sununu later said that he had "a lot of disappointment" in Souter's positions on the Court and would have preferred him to be more like Antonin Scalia. In contrast, President Bush said several years after Souter's appointment that he was proud of Souter's "outstanding" service and "outstanding intellect" and that Souter would "serve for years on the Court, and he will serve with honor always and with brilliance".

Notable decisions

Planned Parenthood v. Casey 
In the 1992 case Planned Parenthood v. Casey, the Supreme Court upheld the right to abortion as established by the "essential holding" of Roe v. Wade (1973) and issued as its "key judgment" the imposition of the undue burden standard when evaluating state-imposed restrictions on that right. The controlling plurality opinion in the case was joined by Souter, Anthony Kennedy and Sandra Day O'Connor. Souter is widely believed to have written the section of the opinion that addresses the issue of stare decisis and set out a four-part test in determining whether to overrule a prior decision.  David Garrow later called that section "the most eloquent section of the opinion" and said it includes "two paragraphs that rank among the most memorable lines ever authored by an American jurist".

Bush v. Gore 
In 2000, Souter voted along with three other justices in Bush v. Gore to allow the presidential election recount to continue, while the majority voted to end the recount. The decision allowed the declaration of George W. Bush as the winner of the election in Florida to stand.

In his 2007 book The Nine: Inside the Secret World of the Supreme Court, Jeffrey Toobin wrote of Souter's reaction to Bush v. Gore:

The above passage was disputed by Souter's longtime friend Warren Rudman. Rudman told the New Hampshire Union Leader that while Souter was discomfited by Bush v. Gore, it was not true that he had broken down into tears over it.

Relationship with other justices 

Souter worked well with Sandra Day O'Connor and had a good relationship with both her and her husband during her days on the court. He generally had a good working relationship with every justice, but was particularly fond of Ruth Bader Ginsburg, and considered John Paul Stevens to be the "smartest" justice.

International recognition 
Even though Souter had never traveled outside the United States during his years with the Supreme Court, he still gained significant recognition abroad. In 1995, a series of articles based on his written opinions and titled "Souter Court" was published by a Moscow legal journal, The Russian Justice. Those were followed by a book, written in Russian and bearing Souter's name in the title. Justice of the Constitutional Court of the Russian Federation Yury Danilov, reviewing the 2nd edition of the book in a Moscow English-language daily, made the following remark on Souter's position in Bush v. Gore: "In a most critical and delicate situation, David Souter had maintained the independence of his position and in this respect had become a symbol of the independence of the judiciary."

Retirement 

Long before the election of President Obama, Souter had expressed a desire to leave Washington, D.C., and return to New Hampshire. The election of a Democratic president in 2008 may have made Souter more inclined to retire, but he did not want to create a situation in which there would be multiple vacancies at once. Souter apparently became satisfied that no other justices planned to retire at the end of the Supreme Court's term in June 2009. As a result, in mid-April 2009 he privately notified the White House of his intent to retire at the conclusion of that term. Souter sent Obama a retirement letter on May 1, effective at the start of the Supreme Court's 2009 summer recess. Later that day Obama made an unscheduled appearance during the daily White House press briefing to announce Souter's retirement. On May 26, 2009, Obama announced his nomination of federal appeals court judge Sonia Sotomayor. She was confirmed by the U.S. Senate on August 6.

On June 29, 2009, the last day of the Court's 2008–09 term, Chief Justice Roberts read a letter to Souter that had been signed by all eight of his colleagues as well as retired Justice Sandra Day O'Connor, thanking him for his service, and Souter read a letter to his colleagues reciprocating their good wishes.

Souter's papers have been donated to the New Hampshire Historical Society and will not be made public until at least 50 years after his death.

Post-Supreme Court career 
As a Supreme Court justice with retired status, Souter remains a judge and is entitled to sit by designation on lower courts. After his retirement from the Supreme Court and until 2020, he regularly sat by designation on panels of the First Circuit Court of Appeals, based in Boston and covering Maine, Massachusetts, Puerto Rico, Rhode Island, and his adopted home state of New Hampshire, generally in February or March of each year, but he did not do so in 2021 or 2022.

Souter has maintained a low public profile since retiring from the Supreme Court. But in 2016, comments he made during a 2012 appearance at the Capitol Center for the Arts in New Hampshire about the dangers of "civic ignorance" were called "remarkably prescient" of the presidential campaign of Donald Trump.

Personal life 
Once named by The Washington Post as one of Washington's 10 Most Eligible Bachelors, Souter has never married, though he was once engaged.

Souter was elected to the American Philosophical Society in 1994, and the American Academy of Arts and Sciences in 1997.

In 2004, Souter was mugged while jogging between his home and the Fort Lesley J. McNair Army Base in Washington, DC. He suffered minor injuries from the event, visiting the MedStar Washington Hospital Center for treatment. The problem led to public questioning of the Supreme Court Police's security detail, which was not present at the time.

According to Jeffrey Toobin's 2007 book The Nine, Souter has a decidedly low-tech lifestyle: He writes with a fountain pen, does not use e-mail, and has no cell phone or answering machine. While serving on the Supreme Court, he preferred to drive back to New Hampshire for the summer, where he enjoyed mountain climbing. Souter has also done his own home repairs and is known for his daily lunch of an apple and yogurt.

Former Supreme Court correspondent Linda Greenhouse wrote of Souter: "to focus on his eccentricities—his daily lunch of yogurt and an apple, core and all; the absence of a computer in his personal office—is to miss the essence of a man who in fact is perfectly suited to his job, just not to its trappings. His polite but persistent questioning of lawyers who appear before the court displays his meticulous preparation and his mastery of the case at hand and the cases relevant to it. Far from being out of touch with the modern world, he has simply refused to surrender to it control over aspects of his own life that give him deep contentment: hiking, sailing, time with old friends, reading history."

In early August 2009, Souter moved from his family farmhouse in Weare to a Cape Cod-style single-floor home in nearby Hopkinton, New Hampshire, a town in Merrimack County northeast of Weare and immediately west of the state capital of Concord. Souter told a disappointed Weare neighbor that the two-story family farmhouse was not structurally sound enough to support the thousands of books he owns and that he wished to live on one level.

Over the years, Souter has served on hospital boards and civic committees. He is a former honorary co-chair of the We the People National Advisory Committee.

See also 

 George H. W. Bush Supreme Court candidates
 Ideological leanings of United States Supreme Court justices
 List of justices of the Supreme Court of the United States
 List of law clerks of the Supreme Court of the United States (Seat 3)
 List of justices of the Supreme Court of the United States by court composition
 List of justices of the Supreme Court of the United States by seat
 List of United States Supreme Court justices by time in office
 United States Supreme Court cases during the Rehnquist Court
 United States Supreme Court cases during the Roberts Court
 Lost Liberty Hotel

References

Further reading 
 Abraham, Henry J., Justices and Presidents: A Political History of Appointments to the Supreme Court. 3rd ed. (New York: Oxford University Press, 1992). .
 Cushman, Clare, The Supreme Court Justices: Illustrated Biographies, 1789–1995. 2nd ed. (Supreme Court Historical Society; Congressional Quarterly Books, 2001). .
 Frank, John P., The Justices of the United States Supreme Court: Their Lives and Major Opinions (Leon Friedman and Fred L. Israel, editors). (Chelsea House Publishers, 1995). .
 Hall, Kermit L., ed. The Oxford Companion to the Supreme Court of the United States. (New York: Oxford University Press, 1992). .
 Martin, Fenton S., and Goehlert, Robert U., The U.S. Supreme Court: A Bibliography. (Congressional Quarterly Books, 1990). .
 Urofsky, Melvin I., The Supreme Court Justices: A Biographical Dictionary. (New York: Garland Publishing 1994). .

External links 

 
 
 Issue positions and quotes at OnTheIssues
 
 Supreme Court Justice Souter To Retire, Nina Totenberg, NPR, May 3, 2009
 Online Symposium: Justice Souter and the First Amendment, First Amendment Center, July 23, 2009
 The Selling of Judge David Souter to Movement Conservatives
 David Souter discusses his post-Supreme Court future in the Harvard Law Record, October 2, 2009
 Justice David Souter's Harvard Commencement Remarks, Harvard Gazette, May 27, 2010
 Supreme Court Associate Justice Nomination Hearings on David Hackett Souter in September 1990 United States Government Publishing Office

|-

|-

|-

1939 births
Living people
20th-century American lawyers
20th-century American judges
21st-century American judges
Alumni of Magdalen College, Oxford
American Episcopalians
American Rhodes Scholars
Harvard Law School alumni
Judges of the United States Court of Appeals for the First Circuit
New Hampshire Attorneys General
New Hampshire Republicans
Justices of the New Hampshire Supreme Court
People from Melrose, Massachusetts
People from Weare, New Hampshire
People from Hopkinton, New Hampshire
United States court of appeals judges appointed by George H. W. Bush
United States federal judges appointed by George H. W. Bush
Justices of the Supreme Court of the United States
Harvard College alumni
Members of the American Philosophical Society